Jakarta Outer Ringroad 2 (Indonesian: Jalan Tol Lingkar Luar Jakarta 2) or JORR 2 is an under-construction toll road circling the Greater Jakarta area, running roughly parallel with the Jakarta Outer Ring Road (JORR 1) in Indonesia. This toll road will connect Soekarno-Hatta International Airport to Cilincing, crossing Tangerang, South Tangerang, Depok, Bekasi, Bekasi Regency. and North Jakarta. It is expected to be able to relieve the traffic of other toll roads in the Greater Jakarta area.

Sections 
JORR 2 is divided into several sections:

Interchanges

Routes

See also

Jakarta Inner Ring Road
Jakarta Outer Ring Road
Jakarta Elevated Toll Road
 Transport in Indonesia

References

External links
PT Jasa Marga website
PT JLJ website
Progress

Toll roads in Indonesia
Transport in Jakarta
Ring roads in Indonesia

fr:Ceinture périphérique extérieure de Jakarta